George Grigore (born 2 February 1958) is a Romanian writer, essayist, translator, professor, researcher in Middle Eastern Studies.

Biography
George Grigore was born in the village of Grindu, Ialomița (southeastern Romania), on 2 February 1958. In 1983, he graduated the Faculty of Foreign Languages and Literatures of the University of Bucharest. In 1997, he earned a Ph.D. from the same university, with the dissertation entitled Some Questions Regarding the Translation of the Qur’an into Romanian.

In 2000, as an editor-translator at Kriterion Publishing House :ro:Editura Kriterion, he launched the Bibliotheca Islamica collection, where he has published his own translations of numerous works fundamental to Islamic culture, and works of other translators. His translation of the Qur’an was most noteworthy and published in several editions, including a bilingual one, printed in Istanbul, in 2003. He has published studies on the Qur’an and Islam, as well as on the Arabic dialects, with a special focus on the dialects of Baghdad and Mardin. He has also undertaken research in Kurdish Studies.

Since 2001, George Grigore has been the associate editor of Romano-Arabica, the academic review published by the Center of Arabic Studies at the University of Bucharest.

Grigore has published translations of Romanian literature into Arabic, among which The Mould, by the Romanian playwright Marin Sorescu (Al-Mağrā, Baghdad) and The Tyranny of Dream, by the Romanian poet Carolina Ilica (Taghyān al-Hulm, Lebanon). His anthology of Romanian poetry rendered into Arabic (Kāna yağibu, Baghdad) has been awarded the prize of the Iraqi Writers Union.

In addition to lecturing at the University of Bucharest, Grigore has written various practical books for students of the Arabic language, such as dictionaries, a conversation guide, and a manual of orthography and calligraphy.

Affiliations
Member of the Association Internationale de Dialectologie Arabe
Member of the Romanian Association for Religious Studies
Member of the Writers’ Union of Romania
Honorary Member of the Iraqi Writers’ Union
Member of the Center of Arabic Studies, University of Bucharest
Ambassador of Alliance of Civilizations for Romania

List of works and translations published (selection)
L’arabe parlé à Mardin. Monographie d’un parler arabe “périphérique”, Editura Universitatii din Bucuresti, 2007 
Problematica traducerii Coranului în limba română (Questions Regarding the Translation of the Qur’an into Romanian), Ararat, 1997
Poveşti irakiene (Iraqi Tales), Coresi, 1993
Slujitorii Diavolului; Cartea Neagră, Cartea Dezvăluirii (Worshipers of Devil. The Black Book, The Book of Revelation), Călin, 1994
Poporul kurd – file de istorie (The Kurdish People. Pages of History), Interprint, 1997
Dicţionar Arab-român (Arabic-Romanian Dictionary), Teora, 1998
Coranul (The Qur’an), Kriterion :ro:Editura Kriterion, 2000; 2002; Herald, 2005
Al-Ghazali, Firida luminilor (The Niche of Lights), Kriterion, 2001
Ibn Tufayl, Hayy bin Yaqzan, Kriterion, 2001
Ibn Ruşd, Cuvânt hotărâtor (Ibn Rushd – The Decisive Word), Kriterion, 2001
Badiuzzaman Said Nursi, Cuvinte [Words], Nesıl Yayınları, Istanbul, 2002
Ibn 'Arabi, Geneza cercurilor [The Genesis of Circles], Kriterion, 2003
Coranul [The Qur’an – bilingual edition, Romanian-Arabic], Çağrı Yayınları, Istanbul, 2003
Ochiul lăuntric – perspective islamice asupra divinităţii [The Inner Eye. Islamic Perspectives on Divinity], Herald, 2005
‘Ali bin Abi Talib, Nahj al-Balagha / Calea vorbirii alese (Peak of Eloquence), Kriterion, 2008
 Mahmoud Darwish, Sunt arab. Poeme (I am Arab. Poems). Kriterion, 2009
 Ibn Sīnā (Avicenna), The Book of Definitions (trilingual edition: Arabic, Romanian, Latin). Translation from the Arabic language, analysis and bibliography by George Grigore. Notes and comments by George Grigore, Alexander Baumgarten, Paula Tomi and Mădălina Pantea. Chronological table by Gabriel Bițună. Critical transcription of the Latin version of the treaty and the comments of Andrea Alpago (1546), along with the translation of the comments in the Romanian language, by Alexander Baumgarten. Iași: Polirom Publishing House, Medieval Library Series, 2012.

References

External links
A bibliography of George Grigore's works in Ioana Feodorov, The Arab World in the Romanian Culture 
The Arabic Department, Faculty of Foreign Languages and Literatures, University of Bucharest 
The Chair of Oriental Languages, Faculty of Foreign Languages and Literatures, University of Bucharest 
The Conference The Qur'an: Text, Interpretation & Translation, The School of Oriental and African Studies, University of London 
Online Quran Project includes the Qur'an translation by George Grigore.
Conference on Communication and Information Structure in Spoken Arabic, University of Maryland 
First International Symposium on Mardin History 
Arab Studies at the University of Bucharest: 50 Years 

1958 births
Romanian Arabists
Romanian essayists
University of Bucharest alumni
Linguists from Romania
Romanian philologists
Romanian translators
Arabic–Romanian translators
Living people
Quran translators